Yuhan Corporation is a South Korean pharmaceutical and chemical company headquartered in Daebang-dong, Dongjak-gu, Seoul. It was established in 1926 by New Il-han and has been listed on the Korea Stock Exchange since 1962. Yuhan is one of the top Korean pharmaceutical companies, along with Celltrion, Samsung Biologics, GC Pharma, and Hanmi Pharmaceutical.

Group families
Yuhan-Kimberly
Yuhan-Clorox Co., Ltd.
Yuhan Chemical, Inc.
Yuhan Medica Corporation
Janssen Korea, Ltd.
Gujarat Themis Biosyn, Ltd.(GTBL)

Products

Yuhan Brands
Pharmaceutical
Non-Pharm/Medical Care
Health Food
Dental/Tooth Care
Chemical Cosmetic
Living Product
Animal Pharmaceuticals

Other Brands
Arm & Hammer

See also
Yuhan University

References

External links
 

Chemical companies of South Korea
Companies based in Seoul
Dental companies
Pharmaceutical companies of South Korea
Veterinary medicine companies
Companies listed on the Korea Exchange
Health care companies of South Korea
Pharmaceutical companies established in 1926
South Korean brands
1926 establishments in Korea